Palystella is a genus of huntsman spiders that was first described by R. F. Lawrence in 1928.

Species
 it contains four species, all endemic to Namibia:
Palystella browni Lawrence, 1962
Palystella namaquensis Lawrence, 1938 – Namibia
Palystella pallida Lawrence, 1938 – Namibia
Palystella sexmaculata Lawrence, 1928 (type) – Namibia

See also
 List of Sparassidae species

References

Araneomorphae genera
Sparassidae
Spiders of Africa